Phadung Dao Road is a road in the area of Bangkok's Chinatown, which can be considered a soi (alleyway). The road is made up of two short roads, the first part: from right side of Charoen Krung Road (New Road) toward to Yaowarat Road, the second part: that extended from Yaowarat up till Phat Sai Roads, its total length is about 200 m (0.12 mi).

In the year 1932 during the reign of King Prajadhipok (Rama VII), the Ministry of Interior requested the names of some roads in Bangkok from the king, for celebrate the 150th anniversary of Rattanakosin (Bangkok). He offered that names of the new roads should be neutral names, like Bamrung Mueang or Fueang Nakhon Roads. The Krom Phra A-Lak (Royal Scribe Department) at that time thought of the name of roads that ran from Charoen Krung to Phat Sai Roads and it was divided into two parts. The Ministry of Interior suggested that they should actually be one road, so the Krom Phra A-Lak had thought of the names for the roads that started from Charoen Krung Road followed by Phadung Phao Road or Phadung Dao Road, Yaowarat Road, Phat Sai Road. Finally, the king had selected the name of the road to be Phadung Dao Road ("the road upholding the land"), and he also announced that it is appropriately to be the one road.

However, it is still colloquially known as Trok Texas and Soi Texas (Texas lane), since in the past it was the location of a movie theater named Texas.

In the past, it was a red-light district and was the first place in Thailand where pornographic magazines were sold.

Phadung Dao Road is well-known as a centre of vibrantly various restaurants and street food vendors, especially at night, such as oyster omelet, sea food, barbecued red pork in sweet gravy with rice, Hainanese chicken rice,  crocodile and chevon stewed with Chinese herb, suki, and traditional Chinese sweet dragon's beard candy.

See more
Plaeng Nam Road: a counterpart road

References

Streets in Bangkok
Samphanthawong district